The 2016 South Carolina Senate elections took place as part of the biennial United States elections. South Carolina voters elected state senators in all 48 of the state senate's districts. State senators serve four-year terms in the South Carolina Senate.

The primary election on June 14, 2016 and primary runoff on June 28, 2016 determined which candidates appeared on the November 8, 2016 general election ballot. Primary election results can be obtained here.

Following the 2012 state senate elections, Republicans maintained effective control of the Senate with 28 members.

To reclaim control of the chamber from Republicans, the Democrats needed to net 6 Senate seats.

Republicans retained control of the South Carolina Senate following the 2016 general election and the overall numerical composition of the chamber was unaltered.

Summary of Results

Source:

Detailed Results

Note: If a district does not list a primary or a runoff, then that district did not have a primary or runoff election (i.e., there may have only been one candidate file for that district).

District 1

District 2

District 3

District 4

District 5

District 6

District 7

District 8

District 9

District 10

District 11

District 12

District 13

District 14

District 15

District 16

District 17

District 18

District 19

District 20

District 21

District 22

District 23

District 24

District 25

District 26

District 27

District 28

District 29

District 30

District 31

District 32

District 33

District 34

District 35

District 36

District 37

District 38

District 39

District 40

District 41

District 42

District 43

District 44

District 45

District 46

See also
 United States elections, 2016
 United States House of Representatives elections in South Carolina, 2016
 Elections in South Carolina

References

Senate
South Carolina Senate elections
South Carolina State Senate